The school system of The Wire is a fictional education system in the city of Baltimore depicted in the HBO drama series The Wire. The fourth season of the show introduced an examination of the Baltimore city school system and many new characters including pupils, staff and education board employees.

Administration

Howard "Bunny" Colvin

Colvin was a thirty-year veteran of the Baltimore Police Department and a district commander before his radical policies caused his forced retirement. He moved into working with potential repeat violent offenders in the school system.

Marcia Donnelly
Played by: Tootsie Duvall
Appears in
Season 4: "Boys of Summer"; "Soft Eyes"; "Home Rooms"; "Refugees"; "Alliances"; "Margin of Error"; "Unto Others"; "Know Your Place"; "Misgivings"; "A New Day"; "That's Got His Own"
Season 5: "–30–".
Marcia Donnelly is the Assistant Principal of Edward J. Tilghman Middle School. She is a disciplinary, no-nonsense person whom the students have learned to obey. A veteran administrator, Mrs. Donnelly has become used to the chaotic environment of the school, but she often feels frustrated with the difficulty of keeping order among the children and retaining teachers from year to year. Donnelly is world-weary to the point where she sees an in-school stabbing victim being HIV-negative as a silver lining. She performs sweeps of the school grounds looking for concealed weapons on a regular basis.

Donnelly employs Dennis "Cutty" Wise — ostensibly as a custodian — to perform the duties of a truant officer. By forcing truants to attend one day in September and another in October, the school secures more funding. Cutty eventually returns to her to resign the post because he expected to be doing something more rewarding. She works with Howard "Bunny" Colvin in setting up an initiative to separate students into two groups to improve discipline. She urges Colvin to protect Principal Withers from the consequences of dividing the students, because he has gone out on a limb to support the initiative. She selects the students for the program with input from her colleague Grace Sampson.

Donnelly meets with Bubbles and allows his young assistant Sherrod to enroll in the school. She insists that Sherrod is socially promoted to the eighth grade because of his age. She tells Bubbles that he cannot be allowed to return to the last grade he attended because of the difficulties it would present regarding classroom discipline and funding. She is supportive of impoverished student Duquan "Dukie" Weems and sends clothes home for him via his classmate Crystal Judkins.

Donnelly convinces eighth-grade student Randy Wagstaff to become an informant against other students by threatening to call his foster mother when he is caught with a fake hall pass. When Randy is later involved as a lookout in a possible rape on school grounds Donnelly is forced to suspend him. He tells her that he knows about a murder to try to convince her not to call his foster mother and Donnelly is forced to hand him over to the police department.

The nominal principal, Claudell Withers allows Donnelly to handle all aspects of running the school while he enjoys the status and salary of his position. Donnelly tries to protect the school from being taken over by the state by focusing on improving performance in state assessments. She insists on her teachers' sticking to core subjects and is against deviations from the curriculum. She tries to guide trainee teacher Roland "Prez" Pryzbylewski into following this strategy.

Miss Duquette
Played by: Stacie Davis
Appears in
Season 4: "Unto Others"; "Corner Boys"; "Know Your Place"; "Misgivings; "A New Day"; "That's Got His Own"; "Final Grades"

Miss Duquette is a Doctoral student who assists Dr. Parenti and Bunny Colvin in teaching the "corner kids" special class. A social sciences and psychology student, she uses several psychological techniques to get the children to describe themselves and how they feel about their roles in life. As a rookie teacher from an educated and non-Baltimore City raised background, she is initially disrespected by many of the students especially the classes' two female students Chandra and Zenobia. 

She eventually manages to manipulate the children into articulating their problems and talk about how or why they should improve themselves. When school officials decide to pull the plug on the program, she assists Colvin and Parenti in protesting the program's end, claiming that the students have made progress in the class as human beings. The program is nonetheless shut down.

David Parenti
Played by: Dan DeLuca
Appears in season 4: "Home Rooms"; "Refugees"; "Alliances"; "Margin of Error" (uncredited); "Unto Others"; "Misgivings" and "Final Grades".
Dr. David Parenti is a professor of sociology at the University of Maryland with a special interest in repeat violent offenders. He receives a grant from the university for a pilot study aimed at reducing this behavior. He plans to target 18- to 21-year-olds as this is the age group when the behavior is most commonly exhibited.

He is known to the West Baltimore church deacon who puts him in touch with retired police officer Howard "Bunny" Colvin. Parenti is interested in meeting Colvin because he is well known around campus for his last action in the police department – a program of drug tolerant zones that significantly reduced crime in his district. Colvin takes a salaried position to assist Parenti with his study. 

Colvin wants Parenti to target younger age groups by showing him that violent behavior is entrenched in 18- to 21-year-olds. A visit to Colvin's old district and introduction to an 18-year-old criminal, who tries to assault Parenti for taking notes, convinces Parenti.

Colvin and Parenti decide to focus on eighth grade middle school children and approach the Edward Tilghman middle school with their program. The principal, Claudell Withers, agrees to let them separate children with behavioral difficulties into their own class where they can be targeted and studied. Parenti also gets approval from the education department on Baltimore's North Avenue on the condition that his program does not make any headlines.

With the assistance of eighth grade head teacher Grace Sampson and assistant principal Marcia Donnelly he selects a class of ten students. Colvin refers to their target group as "corner kids". They hire a class teacher and assistant to deal with the students. Parenti is fascinated by the behavior exhibited by his students.  When the program is eventually terminated, Colvin's frustration is in stark contrast to Parenti's excitement about the attention the research will receive from academics.

Roland "Prez" Pryzbylewski

Prez is an ex-detective who showed great aptitude for surveillance and wiretap cases but struggled to maintain his composure in the field. He has embarked on a new career as a middle school math teacher.

Grace Sampson
Played by: Dravon James
Appears in
Season 3: "Dead Soldiers" and "Mission Accomplished".
Season 4: "Soft Eyes"; "Home Rooms"; "Refugees"; "Alliances"; "Margin of Error"; "Unto Others"; Corner Boys"; "Know Your Place"; "Misgivings and "Final Grades".
Sampson is a senior middle school English teacher and is the head teacher for the eighth grade at the Edward Tilghman Middle School. She plays a matriarchal role in the school as many of the students view her as a disciplinary motherly type (all the students act correctly when she approaches them). Grace has a son named Allen, after the boy's father. She had a relationship with Dennis "Cutty" Wise before he was sentenced to a long prison term. When he was released from prison he tracked Grace down and learned where she was working. 

She avoids reconnecting with Cutty but offers him help in the form of putting him in touch with her church deacon to help him find work. Cutty visits Grace again when he has established a boxing gym for local kids. She rebuffs his advances again and tells him that she is proud of him. Grace's sister Queenie is a drug addict and is envious of the way her sister has taken control of her life.

Grace is feared and respected by her students who know her as Mrs. Sampson. She is able to subdue a classroom quickly and commands the attention of children easily. As head of the eighth grade she encourages her teachers to use simple consistent rules in the classroom to make it easy for the students to comply. She is supportive of new teacher Roland "Prez" Pryzbylewski and helps him with discipline problems in his classes when she can. When a student named Chiquan is attacked by a classmate wielding a boxcutter in Pryzbylewski's class it is Grace who steps in and slaps the violent student to disarm her. She comforts the injured girl and asks a responsible student, Crystal Judkins, to phone for an ambulance.

Grace works with Howard "Bunny" Colvin to establish separate classes for two groups of eighth graders that he terms "corner kids" and "stoop kids". By separating the problem "corner kids" from classes he hopes that he can address their specific needs and give the other students more time to learn. Grace helps him to identify children who might be considered "corner kids". She suggests Namond Brice. She works alongside Assistant Principal Marcia Donnelly to select another nine students for the class.

Grace sees Cutty once more when he is working as a custodian bringing truanting children into the school. This time both of them are content to leave their relationship in the past.

Actress Dravon James portrays both Grace and her sister Queenie.

Claudell Withers
Played by: Richard Hidlebird
Appears in season 4: "Boys of Summer"; "Refugees"; "Alliances"; "Know Your Place"; "Misgivings".
Withers is the principal of Edward Tilghman Middle School and has held the post for eleven years. He is regarded as something of a renegade. He entrusts much of the operation of the school to Assistant Principal Marcia Donnelly. Withers goes out on a limb to allow Dr. David Parenti and Howard "Bunny" Colvin to launch a controversial pilot study at his school. Withers holds the education department's administrators in low regard and refers to their headquarters on North Avenue as the "Puzzle Palace".

Students

Namond Brice

Namond Brice is a tough-talking eighth-grade student who struggles to follow in the footsteps of his father, Wee-Bey.

Aaron "Bug" Manigault
Played by: Keenon Brice
Appears in
Season four: "Refugees", "Corner Boys", "Know Your Place", "Final Grades"
Season five: "More with Less" (uncredited), "Not for Attribution", "React Quotes", "Clarifications"

Bug is Michael Lee's younger half-brother.  Michael shows concern in taking care of Bug; he helps Bug with schoolwork and has Dukie look after Bug.  When Michael gets in trouble with the Stanfield Organization, he leaves Bug with his Aunt in Howard County.

Zenobia Dawson
Played by: Taylor King
Appears in season four: "Alliances", "Margin of Error" (uncredited), "Unto Others", "Misgivings", "A New Day" (uncredited), "That's Got His Own" and "Final Grades".

Zenobia is a student at Edward Tilghman middle school who often disrupts classes, in particular she is disruptive in Mr. Prezbo's math class. She is one of the children selected for the special class by Assistant Principal Marcia Donnelly. By the end of the season Zenobia is one of the three students that makes the most progress through the "corner boys" class. When she returns to her regular class she is attentive and doesn't cause any disturbances.

Donut
Played by: Nathan Corbett
Appears in season four: "Boys of Summer", "Soft Eyes", "Alliances", "Margin of Error", "Unto Others", "Misgivings", "A New Day", "That's Got His Own", and "Final Grades".
Donut (given name "Tyrell", as evidenced in the season four finale, "Final Grades") is a student at Edward Tilghman Middle School. He was in 6th grade during season 4. He is interested in cars and is an accomplished, compulsive auto thief. He is friends with Namond Brice, Michael Lee and Randy Wagstaff. He brings Sergeant Ellis Carver's attention to the group when he is spotted in a stolen Cadillac Escalade. 

Carver warns the boys that if he ties them to any further auto thefts he will organize alleyway beatings for each of them. Donut remains defiant, quietly remarking that Carver has a nice car as he walks away. He carries a homemade slim jim that he keeps in his sock. On request, Donut breaks into math teacher Roland "Prez" Pryzbylewski's car when he locks his keys in it, leaving Prez grateful but rather worried about having a kid at school who is evidently able to break into cars. 

When Randy is unexpectedly tasked with distributing Carcetti campaign literature on the day of the primary election, Donut steals an SUV to make the job go faster. Once Donut learns that Randy has already been paid upfront, he asks for his share of the "walk-around" money and leaves.

Donut works with Namond and their even younger friend Kenard selling drugs around their school hours. Donut's carjacking abilities get him into trouble with corrupt patrolman Walker who breaks his fingers. Donut is a reckless driver, often speeding, ignoring traffic signs, and occasionally wrecking the cars he steals. In the final scene of the season four finale, as Namond is on the Colvins' porch getting ready for school, Donut drives by in a stolen SUV with the stereo blasting. Donut and Namond share a nod and then Donut speeds away, through a stop sign at the end of the corner, nearly running into another honking driver while Namond is left smiling at the spectacle.

Crystal Judkins
Played by: Destiny Jackson-Evans
Appears in season four: "Soft Eyes", "Home Rooms" (uncredited), "Refugees" (uncredited), "Alliances" (uncredited), "Misgivings" (uncredited).
Crystal is a keen student at Edward Tilghman middle school and often helps her teachers outside of school. She works with assistant principal Marcia Donnelly over the summer to prepare the school for the new year. She delivers clothes to her impoverished peer Duquan "Dukie" Weems on Donnelly's behalf. She is in Roland "Prez" Pryzbylewski's math class with Dukie and advises Prez about Dukie's home circumstances. When a girl is wounded in a fight in Prez's classroom Mrs. Sampson sends Crystal to the office to call an ambulance.

Michael Lee

Played by: Tristan Wilds
Michael Lee is a soft-spoken eighth-grade student who has adult responsibilities.

Albert Stokes 
Played by: Jason Wharton
Appears in season four: "Home Rooms" (uncredited), "Refugees" (uncredited), "Alliances" (uncredited), "Margin of Error" (uncredited), "Corner Boys", "Know Your Place", "Misgivings" (uncredited), "A New Day" and "Final Grades".

Albert is a small, yet boisterous eighth grade student at Edward Tilghman middle school who often uses profane language and disrupts classes. He is one of the children selected for the special class by Assistant Principal Marcia Donnelly. He shows some improvement in the special class under Howard "Bunny" Colvin. It is revealed that his mother dies on the couch of their home and no one comes for days to get her.

Darnell Tyson
Played by: Davone Cooper
Appears in season four: "Home Rooms" (uncredited), "Refugees" (uncredited), "Alliances" (uncredited), "Margin of Error" (uncredited), "Corner Boys", "Know Your Place", "Misgivings", "A New Day" (uncredited), "That's Got His Own".

Darnell is a student at Edward Tilghman middle school who has a drinking problem and often disrupts classes. He is one of the children selected for the special class by Assistant Principal Marcia Donnelly. Darnell is another one of the three students that show real progress through the special class.

Randy Wagstaff

Randy Wagstaff is an enterprising eighth-grade student who is dependent on social services.

Duquan "Dukie" Weems

Duquan "Dukie" Weems is an eighth-grade student who lives in abject poverty.

Karim Williams
Played by: Jeffrey Lorenzo
Appears in season four: "Home Rooms" (uncredited), "Refugees" (uncredited), "Alliances" (uncredited), "Margin of Error" (uncredited), "Misgivings" (uncredited), "That's Got His Own" and "Final Grades".
Karim is a student at Edward Tilghman middle school who hopes to become an NBA basketball player and sports an afro. He is in Roland "Prez" Pryzbylewski's math class with his former friends Randy Wagstaff and Namond Brice.

References

The Wire characters